The Girls' Room (alternate title Best of Enemies) is a 2000 comedy-drama film. It is the first film by director Irene Turner.

Plot
Mismatched college roommates Casey and Grace struggle to get along. Casey wears black and has an attitude because she has always had to struggle, while conservative and proper Grace has a family with money and will marry Charlie when she graduates. Believing Casey is sabotaging her life, Grace plots revenge, dating Casey's friend Joey and pretending to be interested in Casey's life.

Cast
Soleil Moon Frye as Casey
Wil Wheaton as Charlie
Catherine Taber as Grace
Gary Wolf as Joey
Michelle Brookhurst as Paige
Crystall Carmen as Sweetie
Julianna McCarthy as Nana
Lela Lee as Chloe

Production
Much of the filming was done at Wake Forest University in Winston-Salem, North Carolina.

Reception
In Variety, Lael Loewenstein called the film a "humorous tale of difference and tolerance" and said "[w]inning, intimate performances" by the female stars "anchor the film and help smooth over its occasional lapses in logic." He said the main characters are well developed and neither totally likeable nor always hateful. He described production values as "sharp".

References

External links

2000 films
2000 comedy-drama films
American comedy-drama films
Films scored by Alan Lazar
2000s English-language films
2000s American films